Sultan Saleem (1947 – 21 August 2019) was an Indian cricketer. He played in 44 first-class matches, mainly for Hyderabad, from 1962/63 to 1975/76, including the final of the 1964–65 Ranji Trophy.

See also
 List of Hyderabad cricketers

References

External links
 

1947 births
2019 deaths
Indian cricketers
Andhra cricketers
Hyderabad cricketers
Place of birth missing